San Carlos may refer to:

Places

Argentina
San Carlos, La Plata, Buenos Aires
San Carlos Department, Mendoza
San Carlos, Mendoza
San Carlos Department, Salta
San Carlos, Salta
San Carlos de Bariloche
San Carlos de Bolívar
San Carlos Minas

Belize
San Carlos, Belize

Bolivia
San Carlos, Ichilo

Brazil
São Carlos, a city in São Paulo

Chile
San Carlos, Chile
Isla de San Carlos was an old Spanish name for the Easter Island

Colombia
San Carlos, Antioquia
 San Carlos de Guaroa

Costa Rica
San Carlos (canton)
Quesada, San Carlos, commonly called San Carlos

Dominican Republic
San Carlos, Distrito Nacional

El Salvador
San Carlos, Morazán
La Unión, El Salvador, formerly known as San Carlos

Equatorial Guinea
San Carlos (Equatorial Guinea), a volcano
Luba, Equatorial Guinea, formerly known as San Carlos

Falkland Islands
San Carlos, Falkland Islands
Port San Carlos
San Carlos River (Falkland Islands)
San Carlos Water

Guatemala
San Carlos Alzatate
San Carlos Sija

Mexico
San Carlos Nuevo Guaymas, Sonora
San Carlos Yautepec, Oaxaca
San Carlos, Baja California Sur, or Puerto San Carlos
San Carlos Municipality, Tamaulipas

Nicaragua
San Carlos, Río San Juan

Panama
San Carlos, Chiriquí
San Carlos, Panamá Oeste

Paraguay
San Carlos, Paraguay

Peru
San Carlos District, Bongará

Philippines
San Carlos, Valencia, barangay in Bukidnon
San Carlos, Negros Occidental
San Carlos, Pangasinan

United States
San Carlos, Arizona
San Carlos Apache Indian Reservation, Arizona
San Carlos Lake
San Carlos, California, San Mateo County
San Carlos, Inyo County, California, a former settlement
San Carlos, San Diego, California
San Carlos Bay, Florida
San Carlos Park, Florida
Fort San Carlos, Florida
San Carlos, Texas

Uruguay
San Carlos, Uruguay

Venezuela
San Carlos, Cojedes
San Carlos de Borromeo Fortress, Isla Margarita
San Carlos de Río Negro

People and languages
Charles Borromeo or San Carlos Borromeo, 16th century archbishop and cardinal
Saint Charles of Sezze, an Italian professed religious from the Order of Friars Minor
Rumsen people, or San Carlos Costanoan, a group of the Ohlone indigenous people of California
Rumsen language, or San Carlos Costanoan language

Ships
 , alias Toysón de Oro
 , later Hinchinbrooke
 , a U.S. Navy ship

Transportation
 San Carlos station, a Caltrain regional rail station in California, United States
 San Carlos station (Lima Metro), a rapid transit station in Lima, Peru
 San Carlos (Mexibús), a bus rapid transit station in Ecatepec, Mexico

Universities
Colegio Nacional de Buenos Aires, formerly known as Real Colegio de San Carlos, Argentina
University of San Carlos, Cebu City, Philippines
Universidad de San Carlos de Guatemala, Guatemala City
Federal University of São Carlos, São Carlos, Brazil

Other uses
A.D. San Carlos, a football team from Ciudad Quesada, Costa Rica
San Carlos Convent, San Lorenzo, Santa Fe, Argentina
San Carlos Fortress, Perote, Veracruz, Mexico
San Carlos Stakes, an American Thoroughbred horse race
Teatro di San Carlo, the opera house in Naples, Italy
Teatro Nacional de São Carlos, the opera house in Lisbon, Portugal

See also
San Carlos Airport (disambiguation)
San Carlos River (disambiguation)
San Carlos Cathedral (disambiguation)
Rancho San Carlos (disambiguation)